Litchfield Public Schools  is the school district of Litchfield, Connecticut.

Schools
 Litchfield High School
 Litchfield Middle School
 Litchfield Intermediate School
 Center School
It opened as a grade 1-12 school in 1925. Before it was built, the Berkshire Hawkhurst Hotel occupied its site.

References

External links
 Litchfield Public Schools

School districts in Connecticut
Litchfield, Connecticut
Education in Litchfield County, Connecticut